Wallington is a hamlet in the Town of Sodus, Wayne County, New York, United States. It is located three miles (5 km) southeast of the Village of Sodus and six miles (10 km) south-southwest of the Village of Sodus Point, at an elevation of 404 feet (123 m). The primary cross roads where the hamlet is located are Ridge Road (CR 143), North Geneva Road (CR 140) and South Geneva Road (CR 240). N.Y. Route 104 passes just south of Wallington.

Attractions
Wallington Volunteer Fire Department hosts the 'Bog & Grog', a mud racing event, twice a year on their firemen's field.

A Heluva Good! Country Store was located just west of Wallington which specialized in cheeses, chip dips, sour cream and condiments. It is a subsidiary of HP Hood LLC, headquartered in Lynnfield, Massachusetts. Heluva Good! also operated a cheese packaging facility in Sodus. Both locations closed on June 26, 2015.

The Walling Cobblestone Tavern and Wallington Cobblestone Schoolhouse District No. 8 were listed on the National Register of Historic Places in 1994.

References

External links
Wallington Volunteer Fire Department
The Bog & Grog
Heluva Good!

Hamlets in Wayne County, New York
Hamlets in New York (state)
Populated places in Wayne County, New York